The 1999 European Challenge Cup Final was the final match of the 1998–99 European Challenge Cup, the third season of Europe's second tier club rugby union competition. The match was played on 27 February 1999 at Stade de Gerland in Lyon.

The match was contested by Bourgoin and Montferrand, who are both from France. Montferrand won the match 35–16; outscoring Bourgoin 2 tries to 1. Montferrand tries came from Jimmy Marlu and Christophe Larrue, while Bourgoin's sole try came from Scottish center James McLaren.

Match details

See also
1998–99 European Challenge Cup

References

Final
1998
1998–99 in French rugby union
CS Bourgoin-Jallieu matches